Placidozoa is a recently defined non-photosynthetic lineage of Stramenopiles.

Phylogeny 

In 2016, Philippe Silar presented the following phylogeny for the Placidozoa:

Taxonomy
Infraphylum Placidozoa Cavalier-Smith 2013
 Superclass Wobblata Cavalier-Smith 2006 stat. n. 2013 (paraphyletic)
 Class Placididea Moriya, Nakayama & Inouye 2002
 Order Placidida Moriya, Nakayama & Inouye 2002 [Placidae Cavalier-Smith 2006]
 Family Placidiaceae Moriya, Nakayama & Inouye 2002
 Genus Pendulomonas Tong 1997
 Genus Placidia Moriya, Nakayama & Inouye 2002
 Genus Wobblia Moriya, Nakayama & Inouye 2000
 Genus Allegra Rybarski et al. 2015
 Class Nanomonadea Cavalier-Smith 2013
 Order Uniciliatida Cavalier-Smith 2013
 Family Solenicolidae Cavalier- Smith 2013
 Genus Solenicola Pavillard 1916
 Family Incisomonadidae Cavalier-Smith & Scoble 2013
 Genus Incisomonas Scoble & Cavalier-Smith 2013
 Class Opalomonadea Cavalier-Smith 2013
 Genus Barthelona Bernard, Simpson & Patterson 2000
 Genus Quasibodo Bernard, Simpson & Patterson 2000
 Superclass Opalinata Wenyon 1926 emend. Cavalier-Smith 1996 stat. n. 2006
 Class Blastocystea Zierdt et al. 1967 [Blastocysta Zierdt 1978; Blastocystina Zierdt 1978]
 Order Blastocystida Zierdt 1978
 Family Blastocystidae Jiang & He 1988 non Jaekel 1918
 Genus Blastocystis Alexeev 1911 non Jaekel 1918
 Class Opalinea Wenyon 1926 stat. n. Cavalier-Smith 1993 emend. Cavalier-Smith 2013 
 Order Proteromonadida Grassé 1952 emend. Cavalier-Smith 1993 [Proteromonadea Caval.-Sm. 1997]
 Family Proteromonadidae Grassé 1952
 Genus Proteromonas Kunstler 1883 [Prowazekella Alexeieff 1912] 
 Order Opalinida Poche 1913 stat. n. Hall 1953 emend. Cavalier-Smith
 Family Karotomorphidae Travis 1934 [Karotomorphida Cavalier-Smith 1993]
 Genus Karotomorpha Travis 1934 [Tetramastix Alexeieff 1916 non Zacharias 1898] 
 Family Opalinidae Claus 1874 
 Genus Bezzenbergia Earl 1973
 Genus Hegneriella Earl 1971
 Genus Cepedea Metcalf 1920
 Genus Opalina Purkinje & Valentin 1835
 Genus Protozelleriella Delvinquier, Markus & Passmore 1991
 Genus Zelleriella Metcalf 1920
 Genus Protoopalina Metcalf 1918

References

External links

 
SAR supergroup phyla